James Peter Kerr (born 2 September 1949) is a Scottish former footballer who played for Blackburn Rovers and Bury.

References

1949 births
Living people
Scottish footballers
Association football midfielders
English Football League players
Bury F.C. players
Blackburn Rovers F.C. players
Highlands Park F.C. players
Coventry City F.C. players